"I'll Think of a Reason Later" is a song written by Tony Martin and Tim Nichols, and recorded by American country music artist Lee Ann Womack. It was released in December 1998 as the second single from her CD Some Things I Know.  The song peaked at #2 on the Billboard Hot Country Singles & Tracks.

Content
The song is an up-tempo in the key of E-flat major, beginning with pedal steel guitar and electric guitar. The narrator, in the first verse, has just found out that her ex-boyfriend is about to be married to another woman. Upon discovering the wedding announcement in a paper, she expresses her dissatisfaction with the ex-boyfriend's lover.

The narrator then elaborates on her frustration in the second verse, defacing the woman's picture with a marker and saying that although she "couldn't be happier on [her] own", she is still jealous.

Critical reception
Editors at Billboard gave the song a positive review and wrote, "This feisty little number portrays a woman spurned, but it's more mischievous than mournful. Tony Martin and Tim Nichols have penned a cute, clever lyric. It's totally country, and one of the strengths of the tune is its accessibility. The lyric is very conversational with many country phrasing, and Womack turns in an engaging performance, convincing as the redneck woman scorned. Country radio programmers and audiences should make this one of the earliest hits of the new year."

Chart performance
The song debuted at number 62 on the Hot Country Songs chart dated December 26, 1998. It charted for 25 weeks on that chart, and reached number 2 on the country chart dated April 10, 1999, and remained there for four weeks, having been blocked from Number One by Kenny Chesney's "How Forever Feels". It also peaked at number 38 on the Billboard Hot 100, giving Womack her first crossover on that chart, in addition to reaching number 1 on Canada's RPM country chart.

Year-end charts

References

1998 singles
1998 songs
Lee Ann Womack songs
Songs written by Tim Nichols
Songs written by Tony Martin (songwriter)
MCA Records singles
Song recordings produced by Mark Wright (record producer)